Lorenzo Frana, also known as Renzo Frana, (13 October 1926 – 7 November 2005) was an Italian priest of the Catholic Church who was the Permanent Observer of the Holy See to UNESCO from 1975 to 2002

Biography
Lorenzo Frana was born in Gandino (Bergamo), Italy. He attended a technical school and earned a diploma as an expert dyer. After being ordained a priest, in order to prepare for a diplomatic career, he entered the Pontifical Ecclesiastical Academy in 1959. His early assignments as a member of the diplomatic service of the Holy See included stints as auditor in Great Britain and as chargé d’affaires in the United States.

In 1975 Pope Paul VI named him Permanent Observer of the Holy See to UNESCO. Throughout his tenure in that position he invited a variety of Church prelates to head the Holy See's delegation to UNESCO's annual meeting, either an Apostolic Nuncio, an official of the Secretariat of State, or a senior official of the Roman Curia. Frana allowed himself to take this role only once. In anticipation of his retirement the next year, he delivered the Holy See's principal address to a UNESCO meeting in October 2001. His tenure as Permanent Observer ended with the appointment of his successor on 11 May 2002.

He retired to Gandino where he died in a retirement home on 7 November 2005, at the age of 79.

Frana was an expert on sacred art. He organized an exhibit for UNESCO of crèche figures and then used it as the basis for a museum established in his home town in 1989: il Museo del presepio in Gandino.

Notes

References

1920s births
2005 deaths
Pontifical Ecclesiastical Academy alumni
Permanent Observers of the Holy See to the United Nations
Clergy from the Province of Bergamo